Kamiel Buysse (8 July 1934 – 26 October 2020) was a Belgian racing cyclist. He rode in the 1959 Tour de France. He was the grandfather of Greg Van Avermaet.

References

External links
 

1934 births
2020 deaths
Belgian male cyclists
Place of birth missing